The Veils of Bagdad is a 1953 American adventure film directed by George Sherman and starring Victor Mature and Mari Blanchard.

Plot
In 1560, Antar is sent by Selima, head of the Ottoman Empire, to prevent Pasha Hammam from attempting to overthrow the emperor.

Selima blames Hammam and his assassin Kasseim for the death of her father.

Kasseim's wife, Rosanna, falls in love with Antar, but he wants Selima for himself.

Cast
 Victor Mature as Antar
 Mari Blanchard as Selima
 Virginia Field as Rosanna
 Guy Rolfe as Kasseim
 Leon Askin as Hammam
 James Arness as Targut
 Palmer Lee as Osman
 Nick Cravat as Ahmed 
 Ludwig Donath as Kaffar 
 Howrd Petrie as Karsh
 Charles Arnt as Zapolya 
 Jackie Loughery as Handmaiden
 Thomas Browne Henry as Mustapha 
 David Sharpe as Ben Ali 
 Sammy Stein as Abdallah 
 Bobby Blake as Beggar boy 
 Glenn Strange as Mik-Kel 
 Charles Wagenheim as Bedouin spy 
 Chester Hayes as Wrestler 
 Thomas A. Renesto as Wrestler 
 Hans Schnabel as Wrestler 
 Vic Holbrook as Wrestler 
 Russ Saunders Troupe as Acrobatic Act

Production
The film was originally known as Prince of Bagdad and was based on an original story. In July 1952 Universal announced Victor Mature would star and Maureen O'Hara was his "likely" co-star. Victor Mature was borrowed from 20th Century Fox. He made it after completing The Glory Brigade and before The Robe - however release was held up until after The Robe had been released.

In October, George Sherman was assigned to direct.

Eventually Maureen O'Hara asked to be relieved of the assignment and her role was taken by Universal contract player Mari Blanchard.

James Arness was borrowed from Wayne-Fellows. The film also featured a young Stuart Whitman, who had just signed a long term contract with Universal.

References

External links

 
 
 
 Veils of Bagdad at BFI

1953 films
1950s English-language films
Films directed by George Sherman
Films shot in California
1950s historical adventure films
Films set in the 1560s
Films set in Baghdad
Films set in the Ottoman Empire
Universal Pictures films
American historical adventure films
1950s American films